Etiep is a Torricelli language of Papua New Guinea. There is little data to classify it, and it is therefore left unclassified within Torricelli by Ross (2005).

References

Torricelli languages
Languages of Sandaun Province
Languages of East Sepik Province